Andrew Cadelago is a cinematographer. He has worked as a cinematographer in the animation department on many Pixar films. He also did the cinematography for Bella (2006), a film which took the "People's Choice Award" at the 2006 Toronto International Film Festival.

Filmography

Animation department (10 credits)

 2014 Little Boy (pre-viz supervisor) (completed) 
 2013 Toy Story of Terror (TV Short) (layout artist) 
 2013 Monsters University (layout artist) 
 2011 Cars 2 (layout artist) 
 2010 Toy Story 3 (layout artist) 
 2009 Dug's Special Mission (Video short) (layout artist) 
 2009 Up (layout artist) 
 2008 BURN-E (Video short) (layout artist) 
 2008 WALL·E (layout artist) 
 2007 Ratatouille (layout artist)

 Cinematographer (4 credits)

 2014 Little Boy (completed) 
 2006 Bella 
 2003 Perils in Nude Modeling (Short) 
 2002 Waiting for Trains (Short)

Writer (2 credits)
 
 2012 Snack Attack (Short) 
 2002 Waiting for Trains (Short)

Producer (2 credits)
 
 2012 Snack Attack (Short) (co-producer) 
 2002 Waiting for Trains (Short) (producer)

Director (1 credit)

 2012 Snack Attack (Short)

Editor (1 credit)

 2002 Waiting for Trains (Short)

References

External links
 
 The New York Times Movies
 http://www.fandango.com/andrewcadelago/filmography/p507054

Living people
Year of birth missing (living people)
Place of birth missing (living people)
American cinematographers